The 1922 World Hard Court Championships (WHCC) (French: Championnats du Monde de Tennis sur Terre Battue) was the sixth edition of the World Hard Court Championships tennis tournament, considered as the precursor to the French Open. For the first time, the Championships were not held in Paris, but instead on the clay courts of the Royal Léopold Club in Brussels, Belgium, from 13 until 21 May 1922.

For the second year in a row, Suzanne Lenglen won the singles, doubles and mixed doubles events.

Finals

Men's singles

 Henri Cochet defeated  Manuel de Gomar, 6–0, 2–6, 4–6, 6–1, 6–2

Women's singles

 Suzanne Lenglen defeated  Elizabeth Ryan, 6–3, 6–2

Men's doubles

 Jean Borotra /  Henri Cochet defeated  Marcel Dupont /  Nicolae Mişu, 6–8, 6–1, 6–2, 6–3

Women's doubles

 Suzanne Lenglen /  Elizabeth Ryan defeated  Winifred Beamish /  Kitty McKane, 6–0, 6–4

Mixed doubles

 Henri Cochet /  Suzanne Lenglen defeated  Brian Gilbert /  Geraldine Beamish, 6–4, 4–6, 6–0

External links
 
 

World Hard Court Championships
World Hard Court Championships
World Hard Court Championships
May 1922 sports events
1922 in Belgian tennis